Shravan Chhabria (Hindi: श्रवण) is an Indian Bollywood television actor.

Career 

Shravan Chhabria started a career in modeling with Elite Agency in Mumbai at the age of 19. He then played a role in Prashant Chhadha's film Kuch Meetha Ho Jaaye opposite newcomer Mahima Chaudhry. After two years, he was given another break by Chhadha in Aap Kaa Surroor as the sidekick of Himesh Reshammiya. Shravan has since starred in a few TV serials and become a poker player.

Filmography

References

External links 

Shravan's Profile; Biography

Indian male television actors
Male actors in Hindi cinema
Living people
Year of birth missing (living people)
Male actors from Mumbai